Fitness, also known as Fitnesse, is a brand of breakfast cereals and granola bars produced by Nestlé and Cereal Partners.

In Brazil, the brand is called Nesfit and also includes cookies and drinks.

In July 2015, Nestlé updated its recipe by reducing its sugar content by up to 30% without any artificial sweeteners.

References

External links
 Official website - cereal
  - snack

Breakfast cereals
Nestlé brands
Nestlé cereals